Ferras is an American singer-songwriter and musician.

Ferras may also refer to:

Fərraş, a village in Azerbaijan
Christian Ferras, a violinist
Joe Ferras, a former Canadian ice hockey player
Carlos Ferrás Sexto, a Galician geographer and academic
Ferras (EP), the second EP by the artist Ferras